The International System for Human Cytogenomic Nomenclature (previously International System for Human Cytogenetic Nomenclature), ISCN in short, is an international standard for human chromosome nomenclature, which includes band names, symbols and abbreviated terms used in the description of human chromosome and chromosome abnormalities.

The ISCN has been used as the central reference among cytogeneticists since 1960.

Abbreviations of this system include a minus sign (-) for chromosome deletions, and del for deletions of parts of a chromosome.

Revision history
 ISCN (2020).  S. Karger Publishing. 
 ISCN (2016).  S. Karger Publishing. 
 ISCN (2013).  S. Karger Publishing. 
 ISCN (2009).  S. Karger Publishing. 
 ISCN (2005).  S. Karger Publishing. 
 ISCN (1995).  S. Karger Publishing. 
 ISCN (1991).  S. Karger Publishing. 
 ISCN (1985).  S. Karger Publishing. 
 ISCN (1981).  S. Karger Publishing. 
 ISCN (1978).  S. Karger Publishing. 
 Paris Conference (1971): "Standardization in Human Cytogenetics." (PDF) Birth Defects: Original Article Series, Vol 8, No 7 (The National Foundation, New York 1972)
 Chicago Conference (1966): "Standardization in Human Cytogenetics." Birth Defects: Original Article Series, Vol 2, No 2 (The National Foundation, New York 1966).
 London Conference (1963): "London Conference on the Normal Human Karyotype." Cytogenetics 2:264–268 (1963)
 Denver Conference (1960): "A proposed standard system of nomenclature of human mitotic chromosomes." The Lancet 275.7133 (1960): 1063-1065.

See also
 Locus (genetics)
 Cytogenetic notation

References

External links
 About the ISCN recommendations - Human Genome Variation Society

Cytogenetics
Biological nomenclature